Kungyam is a village in the Leh district in the Indian union territory of Ladakh. It is located in the  rong block chumathang which primarily comes under Nyoma tehsil. Main language speak there is LOCAL LADAKHI

Main language is ladakhi.

Demographics
According to the 2011 census of India, Kumgyam has 68 households. The effective literacy rate (i.e. the literacy rate of population excluding children aged 6 and below) is 81.85%.

References 

Villages in Nyoma tehsil